50 Squadron SAAF  was a South African Air Force squadron during World War II.

History
50 Squadron was formed on 1 December 1939 by amalgamating the SAAF's 17, 18 and 19 Squadrons. During the East African Campaign 50 Squadron operated a 'shuttle service' between the warzone in East Africa and South Africa as part of 1 Bomber Transport Brigade. The brigade was re-designated 5 Wing in February 1941, and continued to fly 'shuttle service' flights between the Mediterranean and South Africa until after the war.

The squadron operated Junkers F.13FE, Ju-86Z/K-1 and Ju 52/3M aircraft which had been requisitioned from the South African Airways at the outbreak of war.  The eleven Ju 52's were assigned to 51 Flight, operating a shuttle service from Nairobi to Egypt, Middle East and South Africa.

Aircraft

References
Footnotes

Bibliography

Squadrons of the South African Air Force
Military units and formations established in 1939
S
Military units and formations disestablished in 1946